Theodosius Rostocki (born as Tadeusz Teodozy Bołbas-Rostocki; ; 1725 – 25 January 1805) was the "Metropolitan of Kiev, Galicia and all Ruthenia". He became the first unite bishop who was a member of the Polish Senate.

On 19 June 1785 Rostocki was ordained by Primate of the Uniate Church Jason Smogorzewski along with bishops Cyprian Stecki and John Kaczkowski as a bishop of Chelm. Earlier that year he also was confirmed as a coadjutor Metropolitan bishop of Kiev, Galicia and all Ruthenia.

Following the death of Jason Smogorzewski, on 1 November 1788 he succeeded as the Metropolitan bishop of Kiev, Galicia, and all Ruthenia. In 1790 he resigned as bishop of Chelm. In 1796 Rostocki created Eparchy of Suprasl on territory of the New East Prussia creation of which was approved by the Pope in couple of years.

He consecrated following bishops Josaphat Bulhak, Porphyrius Skarbek Wazynski and Adrian Butrymowicz.

After the third partition of Poland, Rostocki was detained by the Russian authorities and was forced to move to Saint Petersburg where he died in 1805.

Notelist

References

External links
 Theodosius Rostocki at the catholic-hierarchy.org

1725 births
1805 deaths
Eastern Catholics from the Russian Empire
People from Slonim District
People from Nowogródek Voivodeship (1507–1795)
Metropolitans of Kiev, Galicia and all Ruthenia (Holy See)
Polish senators
Order of Saint Basil the Great